Faleeha Hassan (born 1967) is an Iraqi poet living in New Jersey.

Early life and education
Hassan was born and raised in Najaf. She was a precocious reader as a child, but her schooling was interrupted in 1980 when her middle school was closed for the Iran–Iraq War. She would eventually earn a masters in Arabic Literature from the University of Kufa in 2006.

Career
Hassan began teaching high school in 1988.

In 1991, she became the first woman in Najaf to publish a book of poetry, I Am a Girl.
In 2012, she became the first woman in Iraq to publish a book of poetry for children " A Dream Guard "    
She fled Iraq after her name appeared on a militant group's death list in 2011. She fled first to Eskişehir in Turkey, then to Afyonkarahisar, where she insisted her children be allowed to attend school in order to stay warm.
After working with the United Nations office in Ankara, She was accepted into the United States by a Roman Catholic charity.

Awards and honours
 World Association of Arab Translators and Linguists (WATA)
 The Najafi Creative Festival for 2012 
 The Prize of Naziq al-Malaika 2008
 The Prize of al-Mu'temar for poetry 2010
 The short-story prize of the Shaheed al-Mihrab Foundation
 Phoenix International Festival of Arts and Culture.  
 The judges from Holland traveled to Iraq to award her the prize, 2010.
 Srbrun Poveilu “ silver medal“ from Mesopotamia cultural center Belgrade– Serbia 2018
 Pulitzer Prize Nomination 2018  
 Pushcart Prize Nomination 2018  
 Pushcart Prize Nomination 2019

Books

 Because I Am a Girl (1991)
 A Visit to the Museum of the Shadows (1998)
 Five addresses for my friend the sea (2000) 
 Even after while (2008)
 Splinters(2008) 
 Lack of the Happiness Cells (2008)
 Mom's Poems(2010) 
 Water Freckles (2010)    
 A Dream guard (2012)
  I Hate My City (2013) 
 Let's Strongly Celebrate My Day (2015)
 If Columbus did not discover America (2015)
 SWALLOW (2016) 
 We grow up at speed of war (2016) 
 Lipstick (2016)   
 Mass Graves (2018)
 When I drink tea in a New Jersey (2018)
 Breakfast with Butterflies (2019)
 A Butterfly's Voice (2020)
 War and Me (2022)

References

External links
 Personal website
 https://www.wordswithoutborders.org/contributor/faleeha-hassan

1967 births
Living people
20th-century Iraqi novelists
Iraqi writers
Iraqi women poets
21st-century Iraqi poets
21st-century Iraqi women writers
21st-century Iraqi writers
Writers from New Jersey
21st-century Iraqi novelists